Jesús Antonio Villamor (November 7, 1914 – October 28, 1971) was a Filipino-American pilot who fought the Japanese in World War II.

Early life and career 
Jesús Villamor was one of six children of Associate Justice of the Supreme Court of the Philippines, Ignacio Villamor of Bangued, Abra, and Mariquita Flores. He studied commerce at De La Salle College (now DLSU-Manila) in Manila, hoping to pursue a business career.

During summer, he and his family went to Baguio and stayed in one of the government houses on Hogan's Alley, which are now assigned to Justice of Court of Appeals, just below Cabinet Hill along Leonard Wood Road. One of his playmates during this time was Roberto Lim, son of Brigadier General Vicente Lim.

Jess (as one of his friends would call him), at the age of 14 to 15, was already an aviation bug. He was worried that because of his short height, he wouldn't pass the physical exam. He learned how to fly in the civilian flying school in Grace Park that was located next to La Loma Cemetery. Roberto Lim took his first airplane ride with Jess in a Stearman plane. He also signed Roberto Lim's first civilian license.

He joined the Philippine Army Air Corps (PAAC) Flying School in 1936 and was sent to the United States for training, and after three years, began flying B-17's as part of the US Army Air Forces Strategic Bombing Squadron. In 1939, Villamor assisted in teaching Dwight D. Eisenhower how to fly.

Military service

Philippine Army Air Corps service 
Upon his return to the Philippines, Villamor was assigned to lead the 6th Pursuit Squadron (now 6th Tactical Fighter Squadron) in Nichols Airfield. On July 26, 1941, by order of President Franklin D. Roosevelt, the Philippine Army was incorporated into the United States Army Forces in the Far East. Following this, PAAC was inducted into the Far East Air Force on August 15, with  141 pilots,  17 ground officers, 1,200 enlisted men, and 64 aircraft, with Maj. Basilio Fernando as its Commanding Officer.  No less than Gen. MacArthur himself was the inducting officer. Gen. MacArthur forecasted that Japan will commence with its attack in April 1942, and event at the earliest January 1942.

Eight hours after the attack on Pearl Harbor, December 8, 1941 10:00am PST, bombers and fighters of the Imperial Japanese Army and Navy took off from Takao Airbase in Formosa and attacked sites around Baguio and Iba Airfield in Zambales, with the second wave attacking Clark Air Base and Naval Station Sangley Point.  The following day, the FEAF's capabilities were crippled as it found half of its aircraft inventory destroyed, the Japanese in turn only lost 7 aircraft in the two days of raids giving them practical air superiority over Northern Luzon.

With the FEAF crippled, the 6th Pursuit Squadron at Nichols Airfield was one of the remaining units available to meet the enemy. At 11:30 am on December 10, while the unit was having lunch, general quarters was sounded, and the PAAC would have its baptism of fire. Capt. Villamor, along with Lieutenants Godofredo Juliano, Geronimo Aclan, Alberto Aranzaso, and Jose Gozar met another wave of Mitsubishi G3M bombers and Mitsubishi A6M Zero fighters over the skies of Zablan Airfield  and Pasig with their Boeing P-26 Peashooters. Despite the disadvantage, Villamor and his squadron was credited with four kills – one Mitsubishi G3M bomber and three Mitsubishi A6M Zeros. Two of them by Villamor himself.

The following day, the 6th Pursuit Squadron moved to Batangas Airfield north of Batangas City.  On December 12, a force of 27 bombers and 17 fighters targeted Batangas Airfield, and on this day in Philippine military history a Filipino military aviator died in the line of duty. Lt. Cesar Basa was on patrol has been flying for two hours and only had 15 minutes of fuel left when the Japanese were heading to Batangas.  Despite being outnumbered 7–1, Lt. Basa engaged the enemy and was still able to land his damaged aircraft in Nichols Airfield.  However he was fatally wounded due to ground strafing by a Mitsubishi A6M Zero.

The 6th Pursuit Squadron returned to Nichols Airfield on December 13 with 4 remaining P-26s, and on the following day, Lt. Gozar in turn for the last time in the war was able scramble by himself to meet the Japanese raiders.  Lt. Gozar was able to survive the encounter against three Japanese Zeros with one unconfirmed kill, and land his battered aircraft.

While greatly outclassed and outnumbered, the accomplishment of the 6th Pursuit Squadron has become of a legend and a source of encouragement among the ground forces and the civilians who witnessed their defense over the skies of Luzon. On December 15 Capt. Villamor, Capt. Colin Kelly, and Lt. Gozar were personally awarded by Gen. Douglas MacArthur the Distinguished Service Cross for their valorous defense of the airspace above Manila. Lt. Gozar's wingmate, Lt. Godofredo Juliano on the other hand received the Gold Cross.

Upon activation of War Plan Orange, the 6th Pursuit Squadron and the rest of the PAAC were ordered to destroy their aircraft inventory.  Capt. Villamor and his unit were ordered to a strategic retreat to Bataan and transformed their mission to air defense. Capt. Villamor ordered his unit to rally in Bataan and take up infantry and air defense roles.  He would join Gen. MacArthur and Pres. Manuel L. Quezon on the ferry to Fort Mills on Corregidor Island on December 24, 1941. Capt. Villamor and his unit were still hoping to receive new aircraft from Australia. However, the shipment of the Pensacola Convoy never came through.

For leading his squadron, Villamor was twice cited by the United States Army for bravery, receiving the Distinguished Service Cross for actions on December 10, 1941, and an Oak Leaf Cluster in lieu of a second award of the Distinguished Service Cross (DSC) for actions on December 12, 1941. Villamor is the only Filipino to receive the DSC twice.

On February 9, 1942, Capt. Villamor conducted a reconnaissance mission over occupied Cavite in a PT-13 escorted by four American P-40 Warhawks. No sooner, 6 Japanese Zeros appeared. Capt. Villamor's aircraft damaged but was still able to land it safely.  One P-40 was lost at the cost of 4 Zeros.  Capt. Villamor's mission proved to be a success, as the films were delivered, and the information was collated with the ground observers, and counterbattery fire was put into effect.

Intelligence service 

After his squadron was destroyed, Villamor continued his war against the Japanese as an intelligence officer. Having escaped the fall of the Philippine Islands, volunteering, Villamor received orders to return to the Philippines. Promoted to major, Villamor served as a commander in the Allied Intelligence Bureau. On December 27, 1942, Villamor was part of a team inserted by the submarine  into the Philippines, making contact with Roy Bell on Negros. Villamor went on to work with Bell, who would then make contact with James M. Cushing in 1943. Establishing a chain of direct communication from the Philippines with General Douglas MacArthur in Australia, he coordinated the activities of various guerrilla movements in Luzon, Mindanao and the Visayas. Completing his mission Villamor returned to Australia. Villamor's reports from the field were met with indifference by some within the SWPA, but were later publicly lauded by President Eisenhower.

After World War II, Villamor served with the Military Assistance Advisory Group in the State of Vietnam during 1951 and 1952, and once again in 1955.

Death 
Ret. Col. Villamor died on October 28, 1971, in Georgetown University, Washington, D.C., United States, and was buried with military honors at the Libingan ng mga Bayani in Fort Bonifacio, Taguig, which is located about two kilometers from the Philippine Air Force Headquarters which bears his name.

Awards 

For his bravery as a pilot and ingenuity as an intelligence officer, President Ramón Magsaysay awarded Lieutenant Col. Villamor the Medal of Valor, the highest Philippine military bravery decoration, on January 21, 1954. In addition, Villamor was a two-time recipient of the  Distinguished Service Cross, and one-time recipient of the Distinguished Conduct Star. The Philippine Air Force's principal facility in Metro Manila which was first known as Nichols Field, then later Nichols Air Base, was renamed Col. Jesús Villamor Air Base in his honor.

Distinguished Service Cross Citation 

The President of the United States of America, authorized by Act of Congress July 9, 1918, takes pleasure in presenting the Distinguished Service Cross to Captain (Air Corps) Jesus A. Villamor (ASN: 0-888072), Philippine Army Air Corps, for extraordinary heroism in connection with military operations against an armed enemy while serving as Pilot of a P-26 Fighter Airplane in the 6th Pursuit Squadron, Philippine Army Air Corps, attached to the Far East Air Force, in aerial combat against enemy Japanese forces on 10 December 1941, during an air mission over Batangas, Philippine Islands. In the face of heavy enemy fire from strong air forces, Captain Villamor led his flight of three pursuit planes into action against attacking Japanese planes. By his conspicuous example of courage and leadership at great personal hazard beyond the call of duty his flight was enabled to rout the attacking planes, thereby preventing appreciable damage at his station. Captain Villamor's unquestionable valor in aerial combat is in keeping with the highest traditions of the military service and reflects great credit upon himself, the Philippine Army Air Corps, and the United States Army Air Forces.

See also 
 List of American guerrillas in the Philippines

References

External links 

Jesús A. Villamor Papers at the Hoover Institution Archives

Recipients of the Distinguished Service Cross (United States)
Recipients of the Philippine Medal of Valor
De La Salle University alumni
Filipino military personnel of World War II
1914 births
1971 deaths
United States Air Force officers
People from Abra (province)
Burials at the Libingan ng mga Bayani
Armed Forces of the Philippines Medal of Valor
Filipino military aviators
Filipino World War II pilots
Philippine Army Air Corps
Filipino emigrants to the United States